Game six is a shorthand reference to a sixth game of a sports playoff series. Several World Series have had sixth games that were especially memorable, and were referred to by this shorthand expression. Some of them are:

1975 World Series
1985 World Series
1986 World Series
1992 World Series
1993 World Series
2011 World Series